Golestan-e Olya (also Romanized as Golestān-e ‘Olyā; also known as Qāţer Gūtūran-e ‘Olyā and Qāţer Gūtran-e ‘Olyā) is a village in Sarajuy-ye Sharqi Rural District, Saraju District, Maragheh County, East Azerbaijan Province, Iran. At the 2006 census, its population was 694, in 148 families.

References 

Towns and villages in Maragheh County